Double Take is a 2001 American buddy action comedy film starring Eddie Griffin and Orlando Jones. Double Take was inspired by the 1957 drama Across the Bridge, which was in turn based on a short story by Graham Greene; the supporting cast includes Edward Herrmann, Gary Grubbs, Garcelle Beauvais, and Daniel Roebuck.

Plot

Daryl Chase (Orlando Jones) is a successful investment banker who handles international accounts for a major New York City firm. On his way to work he notices a man named Freddy Tiffany (Eddie Griffin) in a brawl against a thief with a knife. Freddy, able to defend himself, almost gets falsely arrested for theft. But Daryl and his doorman run over to clear Freddy from the police. Daryl gives Freddy $105 for injuries. Moments later Daryl notices Freddy and the man he fought with talking and laughing and realizes the fight was all for pretend as he rushes over but the two run off in a hurry. Chase discovers to his office's surprise, that a soda company sent a great amount of money to its owner's account. Daryl and his boss Charles 'C.A.' Allsworth, discover the money from Daryl's assistant Shari.

Later at Daryl's girlfriend, Chloe's fashion show, Daryl finds out and informs C.A. that the soda company does not exist and does not want to be arrested and charged for laundering money. Then Thomas Chela, Daryl's client who sent the money to Daryl's bank shows up to the show with his girlfriend Maque Sanchez to give gratitude to Daryl for catching his deposit. Later Freddy shows up and dances on stage with Chloe, much to Daryl's irritation.

After the show ends, Daryl and Chloe are attacked by a man who is then shot dead by CIA agents, Timothy Jarrett 'T.J.' McReady and Martinez. McReady explains that the man he was attacked by was an assassin from a drug cartel, who made a $600 million deposit to Daryl's bank. He then shows Daryl and Chloe pictures of Freddy, two drug dealers, and the assassin. McReady tells the two that he has to return to Mexico for an investigation and Martinez has to stay to protect them.

The next day Daryl notices the drug dealers at his office and quickly loses them after a chase. Daryl later goes over to Shari's house and notices her dead with another assassin who shoots at him and two officers who appeared at the front door, leaving the three dead and neighbors noticing Daryl with a gun. Daryl calls McReady and informs him of what happened and McReady tells him to get on a train to Mexico and avoid talking to anybody. At Penn Station, Freddy notices Daryl there and he persuades Freddy to switch clothes and identities, so Freddy poses as a businessman and Daryl poses as Freddy.

On the train, Daryl informs Freddy of the situation. Freddy thinks they are being followed and watched by another man on the train. They both knock the man unconscious noticing he has a picture of Daryl and a gun in his pocket and Freddy takes him off the train. Freddy reads a newspaper and notices a column about Daryl being a suspect in the murder of the cops from earlier. He tells Daryl that there is a $100,000 reward for his whereabouts. Daryl becomes suspicious of Freddy, thinking that he might turn him over to the police.

Freddy then reveals that he believes Daryl is innocent and that he is an FBI agent who goes by Fred Tiffany and his 'street' act was a front and that he is protecting Daryl on the way to Mexico and will then to take out the real criminals. Daryl then knocks Freddy out and then throws him off the train. Daryl is then kicked off for having Delores, Freddy's dog on the train.

Daryl poses as Freddy at the border between Texas and Mexico, then notices a wanted photo of Freddy for the murder of Governor Eduardo Quintana. Daryl panics and rushes the border, getting shot at. Daryl ditches his car, only to be stopped by Freddy. They both drive to a gas station to dance to a song on the radio. With Freddy distracted, Daryl steals the car and leaves Freddy and Delores.

Daryl goes to an emu ranch motel. Then the owner, Junior, notices Freddy's card on Daryl and his wanted photo, assuming Daryl is Freddy, ready to turn him in. Daryl calls McReady who is undercover watching drug smugglers load up a plane filled with cocaine. McReady informs Daryl that Freddy was kicked out of the Bureau a couple of years ago because he was mental. Daryl then calls Chloe with Agents Norville and Gradney who only pretended to be drug dealers but were still after Daryl for the murders. Freddy arrives at the motel to show him that he had placed a transmitter on Daryl when they swapped clothes so he would not lose him if he ran.

At a bar, Freddy informs Daryl that McReady and Martinez are corrupt agents, the soda company who made the deposit is actually a drug front and Thomas Chella is really Minty Gutierrez who runs the drug cartel. He is suspected of being involved in Quintana's murder because he was caught on camera at the side of his house.

Daryl and Freddy go back to the motel and Freddy notices soda, water, and cookie brand trucks approaching to kill Freddy. Freddy realizing those are McReady's men out there to kill him and tries to use a pen to get a strike team over to him fast but can't find the right one. A shootout occurs between the truckers and the police with Daryl being grabbed by the motel's owner and taken to a police station and Freddy escaping from the shootout. At the station, Daryl tells the captain he's not really Freddy Tiffany and the motel owner had made a mistake. The captain believes him until Maque shows pretending to be a wife of 'Freddy'. Daryl tries to explain that he has only met her once at the fashion show. But instead, the police lock Daryl in a cell.

McReady shows up to get Daryl out of jail. As McReady signs Daryl out, Daryl notices Martinez and the assassin who attacked him before, still alive. He also notices a photo of Delores next to Quintana, McReady with a dog's bite mark on his leg, revealing that McReady was the one who killed Quintana and that Freddy was right the whole time. Daryl runs from the station and into Freddy, Norville and Gradney. Freddy informs Daryl of their identities, and it was a covert operation. Gradney, who is also a corrupt agent, shoots Norville dead and drives away with Delores in the car as Freddy shoots at him. Arriving at Quintana's mansion with Minty, McReady, Martinez, C.A. and Maque there, Gradney blows Maque's cover as she is an FBI agent as well as Freddy's wife and partner and that the dog's bite connects them to the murders. Daryl and Freddy arrive at the mansion with both having swapped back to their clothes Daryl, Freddy and Maque get the upper hand in the room. McReady and C.A. inform them that Quintana didn't want to join them in the laundering.

Minty then tells C.A. that he has over $600 million in the American banks which the government had frozen and the only chance of him recovering his money is to turn him, McReady, Martinez and Gradney over to the Justice Department which Freddy and Maque happen to be members of. C.A. realizes that was the whole reason Minty made the deposit, leading to a confession. The assassin shows up with Chloe hostage, leading Freddy to shoot him. As a shootout occurs, McReady shoots and kills Minty, while Freddy kills Gradney and Martinez. McReady shoots Freddy in the arm as Daryl shoots at him but misses every shot. McReady prepares to kill them, but Delores bites him in the leg leading him to accidentally shoot his foot, causing him to fall down the stairs and shoot himself numerous times, with one to his head, killing him.

The next morning, C.A. is arrested, and Shari reveals to be alive and an FBI agent who had to get Daryl out of New York for his safety. Later Daryl and Freddy are now close friends as well as Chloe and Maque hanging out at a beach. Daryl tries to sign a check, but grabs the wrong pen and moments later, a strike team storms the beach.

Cast

Box office
The film opened at #4 at the North American box office making $11.7 million USD in its opening weekend behind Traffic, Cast Away and Save the Last Dance, which debuted at the top spot.

Reception
The film received mostly negative reviews. 12% of 78 critics gave the film a positive review according to review aggregator Rotten Tomatoes. The site's consensus states: "Despite a good performance by Orlando Jones, the movie is ruined by a ridiculous, messy plot and fails to generate laughs".

Music

A dance competition in the film features the song Return of the Tres by hip hop group Delinquent Habits. A remix of the Joe song Stutter featuring Mystikal was featured in this film. This version of the song was marketed as "The Double Take Remix", due to its appearance in this film.

References

External links
 
 

2001 films
2001 action comedy films
American action comedy films
Touchstone Pictures films
Films directed by George Gallo
Films scored by Graeme Revell
Films set in Mexico
Films set in New York City
Films set in Texas
Films shot in Mexico
Films shot in New York City
Films shot in Texas
Films based on works by Graham Greene
Films about Mexican drug cartels
2001 comedy films
American buddy comedy films
2000s English-language films
2000s American films
2000s Mexican films